The Evergreen Maritime Museum is a maritime museum in Zhongzheng District, Taipei City, Taiwan.

History
After nearly a decade of planning, the museum was opened on 7 October 2008.

Mission
The mission of the museum is to preserve and present the history, art and science of boats and ships, in the hope of generating public interest in maritime culture and in turn inspiring the pursuit of knowledge and the spirit of exploration.

Architecture
 Ticket office, information corner, museum shop
 Navigation and exploration
 Maritime Taiwan and marine paintings
 Modern ships and special exhibition
 History of ships

Exhibitions and collections
The Evergreen Maritime Museum consists of multiple exhibitions spanning five floors including scale models, dioramas, maps and globes, various navigational equipment, anchors, graphic timelines and vessel backgrounds, and interactive games for kids. There is also a special section dedicated to the Titanic as well as some poignant artifacts from Titanic passengers.
The ground floor is free to the public and features a cafe, and a giftshop. (See [https://www.youtube.com/watch?v=eTzItANGZ0Y First floor of Evergreen Maritime Museum)

Floors 2–5 include comprehensive showcases of scale model ships both ancient and modern along with other memorabilia. Though not apparent from the museum's official website, the permanent collection on display on these floors is vast and of high quality.

The exhibitions are divided by the following categories:
 Maritime Taiwan 
 Marine paintings
 Modern ships
 History of ships

Scale model collection

Here is a partial list of the scale models (ship vessels) on display as of (4 June 2017)

Visitor information

Language requirements
The museum is English, Japanese, and Chinese language friendly. All placards, way-finding, etc., are bilingual in English and Chinese with equal content in both languages. There are special booklets in the exhibitions for Japanese visitors.

Multi-language tours are available upon request on the ground floor. Ask the gift shop / ticketing booth staff.
Audio guides (using your smartphone with headphones) are also available via scanning QR codes throughout the museum.

Visiting hours
Open on Tuesday–Sunday: 9:00–17:00

Closures: 	
Every Monday (open on national holidays)
Chinese New Year's Eve
Day-off due to natural disaster
Other planned closures announced on the official website.

Accessibility
The museum is wheelchair accessible with elevator access to all floors.

Museum address
5F., No.11, Zhongshan S.Rd., 
Zhongzheng District, Taipei City 100, 
Taiwan (R.O.C.)

Transportation
The museum is accessible within walking distance from two MRT stations. One way is southeast from NTU Hospital Station of the Taipei Metro.
Another way to the museum is from MRT Chiang Kai Shek Memorial, Exit 5 of Taipei Metro and crossing main plaza of the Chiang Kai Chek Memorial, National Theatre and Concert Hall.

See also
 List of museums in Taiwan
 Evergreen Group
 Maritime industries of Taiwan

References

External links

  

2008 establishments in Taiwan
Museums established in 2008
Museums in Taipei
Maritime museums in Taiwan
Museum